12 teams took part in the league with FC Dynamo Moscow winning the championship.

League standings

Results

Top scorers
16 goals
 Vasily Buzunov (CSK MO Moscow)

14 goals
 Valentin Ivanov (Torpedo Moscow)

13 goals
 Aleksei Mamykin (Dynamo Moscow)

12 goals
 Nikita Simonyan (Spartak Moscow)
 Viktor Sokolov (Lokomotiv Moscow)
 Eduard Streltsov (Torpedo Moscow)

10 goals
 Yuri Belyayev (CSK MO Moscow)
 Genrikh Fedosov (Dynamo Moscow)

9 goals
 Mikhail Koman (Dynamo Kiev)
 Viktor Voroshilov (Lokomotiv Moscow)

References

 Soviet Union - List of final tables (RSSSF)

Soviet Top League seasons
1
Soviet
Soviet